The Borzoi or Russian Hunting Sighthound is a Russian breed of hunting dog of sighthound type. It was formerly used for wolf hunting, and until 1936 was known as the Russian Wolfhound.

Etymology 

The system by which Russians over the ages named their sighthounds was a series of descriptive terms rather than actual names.  is the masculine singular form of an archaic Russian adjective that means 'fast'. ('fast dog') is the basic term for sighthounds used by Russians, though  is usually dropped.

History 

The Borzoi originated in sixteenth-century Russia by crossing Saluki and European sighthounds with thick-coated Russian breeds.

The Borzoi was popular with the Tsars before the 1917 revolution. For centuries, Borzoi’ could not be purchased but only given as gifts from the Tsar. Grand Duke Nicholas Nicolaievich of Russia bred countless Borzoi at Perchino, his private estate.

The Russkaya Psovaya Borzaya was definitively accepted by the Fédération Cynologique Internationale in 1956.

Description

Appearance 
Borzois are large Russian sighthounds that resemble some central Asian breeds such as the Afghan hound, Saluki, and the Kyrgyz Taigan. Borzois come in virtually any colour. The Borzoi coat is silky and flat, often wavy or slightly curly. The long top-coat is quite flat, with varying degrees of waviness or curling. The soft undercoat thickens during winter or in cold climates, but is shed in hot weather to prevent overheating. In its texture and distribution over the body, the Borzoi coat is unique. There should be a frill on its neck, as well as feathering on its hindquarters and tail.

Temperament 

The Borzoi is an athletic and independent breed of dog with a calm temperament. 

In terms of obedience, Borzois are selective learners who quickly become bored with repetitive, apparently pointless activity, and they can be very stubborn when they are not properly motivated. For example, food rewards, or "baiting", may work well for some individuals, but not at all for others. Nevertheless, Borzois are definitely capable of enjoying and performing well in competitive obedience and agility trials with the right kind of training.

Health 

Stated life expectancy is 10 to 12 years. Median lifespan based on a UK Kennel Club survey is 9 years 1 month. 1 in 5 died of old age, at an average of 10 to 11.5 years. The longest lived dog lived to 14 years 3 months. Dogs that are physically fit and vigorous in their youth through middle age are more vigorous and healthy as elderly dogs, all other factors being equal. In the UK, cancer and cardiac problems seem to be the most frequent causes of premature death.

Notes

References

Further reading 

  Including a translation of The Perchino Hunt by His Excellency Dmitri Walzoff (1912).
 
 
 

FCI breeds
Sighthounds
Wolf hunting
Rare dog breeds